Peter Lown (born May 29, 1947 in Bolton, Lancashire, England) is a former field hockey player.

Lown competed for Canada at the 1976 Summer Olympics in Montreal, Quebec, Canada. He finished in tenth place with the Men's National Team.

International senior competitions

 1976 – Olympic Games, Montreal (10th)
 Peter has also been instrumental in the ULCC (Uniform Law Conference of Canada) for several years.

References
 Canadian Olympic Committee

External links
 

1947 births
Living people
Canadian male field hockey players
English emigrants to Canada
Field hockey players at the 1976 Summer Olympics
Olympic field hockey players of Canada
Sportspeople from Bolton
Pan American Games medalists in field hockey
Pan American Games silver medalists for Canada
Field hockey players at the 1975 Pan American Games
Medalists at the 1975 Pan American Games